Liliana Scaricabarozzi (5 October 1934 – 21 January 1996) was an Italian gymnast. She competed in seven events at the 1952 Summer Olympics.

References

External links
 

1934 births
1996 deaths
Italian female artistic gymnasts
Olympic gymnasts of Italy
Gymnasts at the 1952 Summer Olympics
Place of birth missing